The Salvation Army Lass is a 1909 American silent short drama film directed by D. W. Griffith.

Cast
 Florence Lawrence as Mary Wilson
 Harry Solter as Bob Walton
 Charles Inslee as Harry Brown

References

External links
 

1909 films
1909 drama films
1909 short films
Silent American drama films
American silent short films
American black-and-white films
Films directed by D. W. Griffith
1900s American films